Chamoy may refer to:

 Chamoy (sauce), a Mexican condiment
 Chamoy, Aube, France
 Chamoy Thipyaso (born 1940), Thai prisoner

See also
 Chamois (disambiguation)